Lucie Vrbenská (born 12 May 1977, in Prague) is a female hammer thrower from the Czech Republic. Her personal best throw is 67.86 metres, achieved in July 2003 in Olomouc.

Competition record

References
sports-reference

1977 births
Living people
Czech female hammer throwers
Athletes (track and field) at the 2004 Summer Olympics
Olympic athletes of the Czech Republic
Athletes from Prague
21st-century Czech women